is a Japanese manga series by Kōichirō Yasunaga which ran in Shōnen Sunday Zōkan beginning in 1983. The manga was written as a parody gag manga inspired by the tokusatsu series Ultraseven. An anime OVA based on the manga was released in 1986. The anime was released on DVD in North America by ADV Films on April 18, 2006.

Summary
The evil secret society known as the Telephone Pole Gang seeks to take over the world by first taking over a certain prefecture on Kyūshū (they never specify which one). In order to thwart the evil plans of the Telephone Pole Gang, Imazuru High School creates the Prefectural Earth Defense Force, composed of problem teachers and students from the school. They are also joined by a cyborg transfer student from India.

The Telephone Pole Gang is commanded by Chilthonian (full name ).

Manga
There are four volumes collecting this story.

Original release

Re-release

Anime

Cast
Baradagi: Hiromi Tsuru
Karmi Santin: Hirotaka Suzuoki
Takei Sukekubo: Tesshō Genda
Chilthonian: Shūichi Ikeda
Hiroaki Narita: Tōru Furuya
Toshiyuki Roberi: Hideyuki Tanaka
Miyuki Ōyama: Keiko Han
Dr. Mafune: Kōji Totani
Shokutsū: Masaharu Satō
Dr. Inoue: Kōhei Miyauchi
Akiko Ifukube: Rika Fukami
Scope Tsuruzuki: Takeshi Aono
Yūko Inoue: Toshiko Fujita

Staff
Original Manga: Kōichirō Yasunaga
Script: Kazunori Itō
Character Design: Katsumi Aoshima
Art Director: Shichirō Kobayashi
Animation Director: Katsumi Aoshima
Music: Kentarō Haneda
Director of Photography: Jurō Sugimura
Color Coordinators: Atsuko Takahira, Hiromi Fujita
Sound Director: Masahiru Komatsu
Director: Keiji Hayakawa
Animation Production: Studio Gallop
Produced by Shogakukan

References

External links
JMDB entry for Prefectural Earth Defense Force 

1983 manga
1986 anime OVAs
Shōnen manga
ADV Films
Gallop (studio)
Shogakukan manga